The Basketball Bundesliga Top Scorer award for the highest scorer of each season of the Basketball Bundesliga (BBL). In basketball, points are the sum of the score accumulated through free throws or field goals. The Basketball Bundesliga's scoring title is awarded to the player with the highest points per game average in a given season.

Prior to the 1990–91 season, the league's Top Scorer was the player that scored the most total points in the league during the season. Since the 1990–91 season, the league's Top Scorer is the player with the highest scoring average per game during the season.

Leaders by total points scored

Leaders by points per game

Awards won by nationality

References

External links
German League official website 

Basketball Bundesliga statistical leaders